Julian Talley (born June 9, 1989) is an American football wide receiver who is currently a free agent. He played college football for the Massachusetts Minutemen.

High school
A native of Stratford, New Jersey, Talley attended high school at Winslow Township High School, graduating in 2007.  He was named a First-team All-State Group 3.  His career totals at Winslow included 98 catches for 2,416 yards and 23 touchdowns including setting a school record in his senior year with 946 yards receiving.  Talley signed a national letter of intent with the University of Massachusetts.

College career
After redshirting for the 2007 season, Talley played in all 12 games as a freshman and totaled 18 catches for 234 yards.  Talley followed up his freshman campaign with a 28 catch, 350-yard season in 2009 which included scoring his first collegiate touchdown.  As a junior Talley was named Second-team All-CAA after catching 56 passes for 747 yards and 6 touchdowns.  He was second on the team in receiving yards to teammate and future NFL star Victor Cruz.  In his senior season Talley grabbed 60 passes for 759 yards and 4 touchdowns. Talley was a college teammate of NFL players Jeromy Miles and Victor Cruz.

Professional career

New York Giants
Talley spent the 2012 in the Giants preseason camp before being cut.

Pittsburgh Power
He signed on with the Pittsburgh Power of the Arena Football League early in 2013.  Talley finished the season with the Power catching 74 passes for 821 yards and 17 touchdowns.

Return to New York Giants
Again he was invited to Giants camp in 2013 and following camp he was signed to the practice squad. Julian made his first professional appearance on December 22, 2013 after an injury to his former college teammate Victor Cruz opened up a spot on the 53 man roster.

On October 6, 2014, Talley along with cornerback Chandler Fenner were cut in order to sign cornerback Jayron Hosley (after completion of a drug suspension) and running back Michael Cox (from the practice squad) to the 53-man roster. On October 8, 2014, Talley was re-signed to the practice squad.

On September 5, 2015, Talley was waived by the Giants. On September 6, 2015, he was signed to the Giants' practice squad. On September 30, 2015, he was released by the Giants. On October 7, 2015, Talley was re-signed to the practice squad. On November 17, 2015, he was released from the practice squad. On December 24, 2015, Talley was re-signed to the practice squad.

Winnipeg Blue Bombers
Talley signed with the Winnipeg Blue Bombers on April 20, 2016. He was released by the team on June 19, 2016.

Baltimore Brigade
On January 26, 2017, Talley was assigned to the Baltimore Brigade. On July 7, 2017, Talley was placed on injured reserve.

Albany Empire
On April 2, 2018, Talley was assigned to the Albany Empire.

References

External links
UMass Minutemen football bio
Arena football bio
New York Giants bio

1989 births
Living people
People from Stratford, New Jersey
Players of American football from New Jersey
Sportspeople from Camden County, New Jersey
Winslow Township High School alumni
American football wide receivers
Canadian football wide receivers
African-American players of American football
African-American players of Canadian football
UMass Minutemen football players
Pittsburgh Power players
New York Giants players
Winnipeg Blue Bombers players
Baltimore Brigade players
Albany Empire (AFL) players
21st-century African-American sportspeople
20th-century African-American people